Robert Nye FRSL (15 March 1939 – 2 July 2016) was an English poet and author. His bestselling novel Falstaff, published in 1976, was described by Michael Ratcliffe (writing in The Times) as "one of the most ambitious and seductive novels of the decade", and went on to win both The Hawthornden Prize and Guardian Fiction Prize. The novel was also included in Anthony Burgess's 99 Novels: The Best in English Since 1939 (1984).

Early life
Robert Nye was born in London in  1939. His father was a civil servant, his mother a farmer's daughter. He attended Southend High School for Boys and had published his first poem, "Kingfisher", in the London Magazine (September 1955; Volume 2, Number 9) by the age of sixteen.   At other times between 1955 and 1961 he worked at a variety of jobs: newspaper reporter, milkman, postman and labourer in a market garden. Nye married his first wife, Judith Pratt, in 1959. In 1961 they moved to a remote cottage in north Wales, where Nye devoted himself full-time to writing. There he developed an interest in Welsh and Celtic legends, reflected later in his fiction for both adults and children.

Writing career 
His first book, Juvenilia 1 (1961), was a collection of  poems. A second volume, Juvenilia 2 (1963), won the Eric Gregory Award. Both volumes were enthusiastically received and Martin Seymour-Smith described Nye as showing a "precocity unique in this century". This view was supported by G. S. Fraser, who in an article in The Times Literary Supplement convincingly established an affinity between Nye's early poetry and that of Robert Graves. To support his continuance as a poet, Nye began to contribute reviews to British literary journals and newspapers. He became the poetry editor for The Scotsman in 1967, and served as poetry critic of The Times from 1971 to 1996, while also contributing regular reviews of new fiction to The Guardian.

Nye started writing stories for children to entertain his three young sons. His children's novel Taliesin and a collection of stories called March Has Horse's Ears were published by Faber and Faber in 1966. When Nye published his first adult novel, Doubtfire (1967), it was described by P. J. Kavanagh as "breathless" and "brilliant"; Kavanagh also referred to the author's "love affair with rhythms and language". That same year Nye divorced his first wife. A year later he married Aileen Campbell, 

Nye's next publication after Doubtfire was a return to children's literature, a freewheeling version of Beowulf that has remained in print in many editions since 1968. In 1970, Nye published another children's book, Wishing Gold, and received the James Kennaway Memorial Award for his collection of short stories, Tales I Told My Mother (1969).

During the early 1970s Nye wrote several plays for BBC radio, including A Bloody Stupid Hole (1970), Reynolds, Reynolds (1971), and a version of Penthesilea by Heinrich von Kleist (1971). He was also commissioned by Covent Garden Opera House to write an unpublished libretto for Harrison Birtwistle's opera, Kronia (1970). Nye held the position of writer in residence at the University of Edinburgh, 1976–1977, during which time he received the Guardian Fiction Prize, followed by the 1976 Hawthornden Prize for his novel Falstaff.

Selected works

Poetry 
 Juvenilia 1 (1961)
 Juvenilia 2 (1963)
 Darker Ends (1969)
 Two Prayers (1973)
 Agnus Dei (1973)
 Five Dreams (1973)
 Divisions on a Ground (1976)
 A Collection of Poems 1955 - 1988 (1989)
 14 Poemes (1994)
 Henry James and Other Poems (1995)
 Collected Poems (1996)
 16 Poems (2005)
 The Rain and the Glass: 99 Poems, New and Selected (2005)
 An Almost Dancer: Poems 2005-11  (2012)

Novels 
 Doubtfire (1967)
 Falstaff (1976)
 Merlin (UK: Hamish Hamilton, 1978) (US: Putnam, 1979)
 Faust (1980)
 The Voyage of the Destiny (1982)
 The Memoirs of Lord Byron (1989)
 The Life and Death of My Lord Gilles de Rais (1990)
 Mrs. Shakespeare: The Complete Works  (1993)
 The Late Mr Shakespeare (1998)

Story collections 
 Tales I Told My Mother (1969)
 The Facts of Life and Other Fictions  (1983)

Stories for children 
 March Has Horse's Ears (1966)
 Taliesin (1966)
 Beowulf: A New Telling (original UK title Bee Hunter: Adventures of Beowulf ) (1968)
 Wishing Gold (1970)
 Poor Pumpkin (1971) - Illustrated by Derek Collard
 Once Upon Three Times (1978)
 The Bird of the Golden Land (1980)
 Harry Pay the Pirate (1981)
 Lord Fox and Other Spine-Chilling Tales (1997)

Plays 
 Sawney Bean [with Bill Watson] (1970)
 The Seven Deadly Sins, A Mask (1974)
 Penthesilea, Fugue, and Sisters (1976)

Editions 
 A Choice of Sir Walter Ralegh's Verse (1972)
 William Barnes, Selected Poems (1973)
 A Choice of Swinburne's Verse (1973)
 The Faber Book of Sonnets (1976)
 The English Sermon 1750-1850 (1976)
 PEN New Poetry 1 (1986)
 First Awakenings: The Early Poems of Laura Riding (1992)
 A Selection of the Poems of Laura Riding (1994)
 Some Poems by Ernest Dowson (2006)
 Some Poems by Thomas Chatterton (2008)
 Some Poems by Clere Parsons (2008)
 The Liquid Rhinoceros and Other Uncollected Poems by Martin Seymour-Smith (2009)
 Some Poems by James Reeves (2009)

References

External links

 Nye at Fantastic Fiction
 Robert Nye Papers Collection at the Harry Ransom  Center
 
 
 

1939 births
2016 deaths
20th-century English novelists
English male poets
Fellows of the Royal Society of Literature
British conscientious objectors
People associated with the Friends' Ambulance Unit
People educated at Southend High School for Boys
Writers of historical fiction set in the Middle Ages
English male novelists
20th-century English male writers